Petri Kaverma (born 4 March 1963) is a Finnish artist and curator who has held several private exhibitions, and participated in various group and joint exhibitions both in Finland and abroad. The themes of his exhibitions have ranged from universal issues to more private and personal topics, and the forms of expression Kaverma uses have varied from photography and video to mixed-media sculptures. Aiming to create a dialogue between the works and their physical and social setting, he has made several works for public spaces. Equally important are the works created in different cultures, particularly in Beijing, China in 2008. Kaverma has taught in several art schools as well as in the Academy of Fine Arts, Helsinki; he has curated exhibitions and organised visual art and environmental art projects both in Finland and abroad.

See also
Robert Smithson
Site-specific art
Environmental sculpture

References
 CV (also downloadable pdf)
 FAFA, Finnish Academy of Fine Arts Kaverma’s PhD thesis: “The Holistic Comprehension & Insight in the Installation Art”, The Artist’s Knowledge 2, (downloadable pdf)
 The virtual research library The Museum of the Contemporary Art Kiasma, Helsinki, Finland

External links
 
 Creating Spaces -environmental art project
 EARN European art research network
 The Helsinki Art Museum The Bridge -environmental work, Helsinki, Finland, 2007
 OTTO, The presentation exhibition of Artists O Vantaa Art Museum & Between Design and Art Minerva Hall, Circolo de Bellas Artes, Madrid

1963 births
Living people
Artists from Helsinki
Finnish photographers
20th-century Finnish sculptors
21st-century Finnish sculptors
Finnish curators